The National Olympic Committee of Cambodia is a National Olympic Committee representing Cambodia.

External links 
National Olympic Committee of Cambodia

Cambodia
Oly
Cambodia at the Olympics
1983 establishments in Cambodia

Sports organizations established in 1983